Vasile Buhăescu (born 2 February 1988) is a Romanian professional footballer who plays as a striker.

Club career

He started his career at the second team of the Vaslui, FCM Huși, but in October 2005, he was selected by Mircea Rednic to play in the first team.  His first match was against Pandurii Târgu-Jiu, and he was seen then as a great star. In his first season he failed to score a goal.

In the next season, he started playing more, and at the final season, he played 24 games.

At the beginning of the new season, he was linked by FCSB, but Adrian Porumboiu rejected the 1 million offer, saying that in a few years he would be worth four times as much. He started in the first 11 in the new season, but because of his injuries, he failed to play more than ten games. His only goal in this season was in a draw, against UTA Arad.

Because of his lack of matches, he was loaned to Concordia Chiajna in winter 2010, for free. In 2011, he was loaned to CSMS Iași and Petrolul Ploiești. He helped Petrolul gain promotion to Liga I. In the summer of 2011 he returned to FC Vaslui. In the 2011/2012 season he helped FC Vaslui to qualify for the first time ever in the Europa League group stages. In the same season he scored two goals in Liga I.

In 2021, he joined CSA Steaua București.

Honours

FC Vaslui
UEFA Intertoto Cup: 2008

Petrolul Ploiești
Liga II: 2010–11

Juventus București
Liga II: 2016–17

Career statistics

Club

Statistics accurate as of match played 27 August 2016

References

External links

1988 births
Living people
People from Huși
Romanian footballers
Association football forwards
FC Vaslui players
CS Concordia Chiajna players
FC Politehnica Iași (2010) players
FC Petrolul Ploiești players
CS Sportul Snagov players
CS Mioveni players
FC Olimpia Satu Mare players
ASC Daco-Getica București players
FC Argeș Pitești players
CSA Steaua București footballers
FC Dinamo București players
Liga I players
Liga II players